Foxwolde is a hamlet in the Netherlands and it is part of the Noordenveld municipality in Drenthe. 

Foxwolde is a statistical entity, and its own postal code. It was first mentioned in 1313 as Fokeswolde and means "the forest of Fokko". The hamlet is outside the build up area, and mainly consists of farms. The population in 1840 was 122 people.

References

External links 
 

Populated places in Drenthe
Noordenveld